= Seidenstücker =

Seidenstücker is a German surname. Notable people with the surname include:

- Friedrich Seidenstücker (1882–1966), German photographer
- Fritz Seidenstücker (1899–1987), resistance fighter against Nazism and politician
- Herbert Seidenstücker
- Johann Heinrich Philipp Seidenstücker (1763–1817), pedagogue
- Karl Seidenstücker (1876–1936), German Buddhist and author
